Shuishanggongyuan Subdistrict is a subdistrict situated on the south of Nankai District, Tianjin, China. It borders Xuefu Subdistrict to the north, Machang and Tianta Subdistricts to the east, Tiyuzhongxin Subdistrict to the south, and Wangdingdi Subdistrict to the west. Its population was 64,853 as of 2010.

The subdistrict's name literally means "Water Park", which is referring to the Tianjin Water Park on the southeast of the subdistrict.

Geography 
Shuishanggongyuan subdistrict is on the south of Fukang River, and west of Weijin River and Tianta Lake.

History

Administrative divisions 
As of 2021, Shuishanggongyuan Subdistrict consisted of 10 residential communities. They can be seen in the list below:

Gallery

References 

Township-level divisions of Tianjin
Nankai District, Tianjin